Thomas McMillan (11 October 1864 – 2 January 1928) was a Scottish footballer.

Career
McMillan played for Mauchline, Dumbarton Athletic, Dumbarton and Scotland.

Honours
Dumbarton
 Scottish Football League: 1890–91, 1891–1892
 Scottish Cup: Runner-up 1887, 1891
 Dumbartonshire Cup: 1888–89, 1889–90, 1890–91, 1892–93, 1893–94
 League Charity Cup: 1891
 Greenock Charity Cup: 1890; Runner-up 1889
 1 cap for Scotland in 1887
 1 cap for the Scottish League in 1894
 11 representative caps for Dumbartonshire between 1885 and 1893, scoring 3 goals
 1 international trial match for Scotland in 1892.

References

Sources

External links

London Hearts profile (Scotland)
London Hearts profile (Scottish League)
Tom McMillan (The Sons Archive - Dumbarton Football Club History)

1864 births
1928 deaths
Scottish footballers
Footballers from East Ayrshire
Scotland international footballers
Dumbarton F.C. players
Scottish Football League players
Scottish Football League representative players
Association football defenders
Association football wing halves
People from Mauchline